Venus Isle is the third studio album by guitarist Eric Johnson, released on September 3, 1996, through Capitol Records. The album reached No. 51 on the U.S. Billboard 200, the highest position in Johnson's career, and remained on that chart for six weeks. "Pavilion" was released as a single and reached No. 33 on Billboard'''s Mainstream Rock chart, while its B-side "S.R.V." is a tribute to guitarist Stevie Ray Vaughan and features his elder brother Jimmie Vaughan as a guest soloist. "Camel's Night Out" is featured as downloadable content for the video game Guitar Hero World Tour (2008) and can also be exported to Guitar Hero 5 (2009).

The album's original title was to be Travel One Hope, but this was changed at the last minute by Capitol for "being too oblique." Advance promotional CDs of Travel One Hope have since become a collector's item.

Critical reception

Stephen Thomas Erlewine at AllMusic gave Venus Isle three stars out of five, describing Johnson as a "consummate guitarist" and "a joy to hear him play". However, he criticized the album for not breaking any new ground following the six-year gap from its 1990 predecessor Ah Via Musicom, remarking that it "reveals no new insights about the guitarist, it only offers a new spin on the territory Ah! Via Musicom'' covered."

Track listing

Personnel

Eric Johnson – lead vocals (tracks 1–3, 5, 9), guitar (all tracks), guitar synthesizer, synthesizer (track 2), piano, electric sitar, arrangement, engineering, production
Amit Chatterjee – vocals (tracks 1, 3)
Christopher Cross – vocals (tracks 3, 5)
Jimmie Vaughan – additional guitar solos (track 4)
Steve Barber – synthesizer (tracks 1–5, 8–10), Hammond B3, arrangement
Tommy Taylor – drums (tracks 1–7, 9–11), percussion (tracks 3, 11), arrangement
Bill Maddox – drums (track 8), engineering
James Fenner – percussion (tracks 2, 5, 6)
Chris Searles – percussion (tracks 3, 5)
Kyle Brock – bass (tracks 1, 2, 4, 5–7, 10), arrangement
Roscoe Beck – bass (tracks 3, 9, 10, 11), engineering
Chris Maresh – bass (track 8)
Richard Kilmer – strings (track 5)
Bruce Williams – strings (track 5)
Jennifer Bourianoff – strings (track 5)
Anthony Stogner – strings (track 5)
Scott McIntosh – trumpet
Vince Mariani – arrangement
Richard Mullen – engineering, mixing, production
John Fannin – engineering
Ethridge Hill – engineering
Malcolm Harper – engineering
John Aguto – engineering
Jeff Poe – engineering
Stuart Sullivan – engineering
Mark Hallman – engineering
John Moran – engineering
James Hoover – engineering
Jeff DeMorris – mixing assistance
Jim Champagne – mixing assistance
Brad Haehnel – mixing assistance
Allen Sides – mixing assistance
Bernie Grundman – mastering
Jimmy McKeever – mastering assistance

Chart performance

Album

Singles

References

External links
In Review: Eric Johnson "Venus Isle" at Guitar Nine Records

Eric Johnson albums
1996 albums
Capitol Records albums
Albums recorded at A&M Studios